Russia won the Junior Eurovision Song Contest 2017 which took take place on 26 November 2017, in Tbilisi, Georgia. The Russian broadcaster Russia-1, owned by the All-Russia State Television and Radio Broadcasting Company (VGTRK) was responsible for organising their entry for the contest. Polina Bogusevich won the contest with the song "Wings".

Background

The twin sisters went on to become the first act from a Junior Eurovision Song Contest to represent their country at the Eurovision Song Contest, performing the song "Shine" at the Eurovision Song Contest 2014, in Copenhagen, Denmark.

Before Junior Eurovision

National final
The Russian broadcaster, Russia-1, announced on 23 December 2016 that they would be participating at the 2017 Contest, taking place in Tbilisi, Georgia, on 26 November 2017. At the time of the announcement, it was also stated that the national final would take place at the children's camp Artek, located on the Crimean Peninsula. Submissions for entrants were open between 30 May to 15 July. A list of nineteen competing entrants was revealed on 17 May 2017, while on 28 May their songs were released with two new added entrants.

Final 
The final was recorded on 3 June, while it aired on Carousel the next day. The national selection final to select the entrant for Russia at the Junior Eurovision Song Contest 2017, were determined by a voting split of 50% jury members and 50% internet voting.

Artist and song information

Polina Bogusevich

Polina Bogusevich (born 4 July 2003) is a Russian child singer. She will represent Russia in the Junior Eurovision Song Contest 2017 with the song "Krylya". Krylya means "Wings" in Russian.

Bogusevich was born on 4 July 2003 in Moscow. In 2014, she competed in season one of Golos deti, where she was a member of Dima Bilan's team. She was eventually eliminated in the battle rounds. Later that year, she went on to represent Russia in New Wave Junior 2014, where she placed second.

"Wings"

"Wings" is a song by the Russian child singer Polina Bogusevich. She will represent Russia in the Junior Eurovision Song Contest 2017.

At Junior Eurovision
During the opening ceremony and the running order draw which took place on 20 November 2017, Russia was drawn to perform thirteenth on 26 November 2017, following Malta and preceding Serbia.

Voting

Detailed voting results

References

Junior Eurovision Song Contest
Russia
2017